Joseph S. Carenza Sr. (died 1981) was a U.S. soccer midfielder who played for numerous St. Louis teams in the 1940s and 1950s.  He went on to coach the Washington University Bears men's soccer team from 1959 to 1964.  He is a member of the National Soccer Hall of Fame.

Player
Carenza was born and raised in St. Louis, Missouri.  He served in the Navy during World War II.  After the war, he joined an amateur team in the St. Louis Catholic Youth Council (CYC) called St. Margaret's Senior.  In the late 1940s, he moved to the St. Louis Major League where he first joined Steamfitters.  He then moved to Patterson and then St. Louis Simpkins-Ford.  In 1951, he played for Zenthoefer Furs when they won the St. Louis Major League by ten points over Simpkins.  In 1954, he became a player-coach for St. Louis Kutis.  During his time with Kutis, the team won the 1956 and 1957 National Amateur Cup and the 1957 National Challenge Cup.  In 1958, he moved to St. Louis Simpkins.

Coach
In 1959, Washington University in St. Louis hired Carenza to establish a men's soccer team.  Carenza was the head coach of the team through the 1964 season, amassing a 31-17-6 (.630) record.
Carenza died in St. Louis on October 17, 1981.

In 1982, Carenza was inducted into the National Soccer Hall of Fame.  In 1996, he was inducted into the Washington University Sports Hall of Fame

Family
He married Mary Ella Newsome after returning from World War II. Their four children include Joseph Carenza Jr., John Carenza, Christopher Carenza, and Mary Lisa Carenza Keenan.

His son, John Carenza, became an Olympic soccer player. Both John and his brother Chris Carenza played professionally in the North American Soccer League.

References

External links
 Washington University team history
 National Soccer Hall of Fame bio

1981 deaths
American soccer players
Soccer players from St. Louis
St. Louis Simpkins-Ford players
St. Louis Kutis players
Zenthoefer Furs players
American soccer coaches
National Soccer Hall of Fame members
Year of birth missing
Association football midfielders
Washington University Bears men's soccer coaches
Association football player-managers